The Call is the third studio album from Joy Enriquez. Lifestyle Music Group released the album on January 15, 2016. She worked with her husband, Rodney Jerkins, in the production of this album.

Critical reception

Awarding the album four stars from New Release Today, Dwayne Lacy states, "The Call just works, and it is not forced." Jonathan Andre, allotting the album four and a half stars at 365 Days of Inspiring Media, writes, "The Call, my favourite gospel infused album I've heard since Mandisa's Overcomer!" Reviewing the album for Hallels, Timothy Yap says, "She is comfortable, expressive, and as her name suggests joyful."

Track listing

Chart performance

References

2016 albums
Albums produced by Rodney Jerkins